Donald Finlayson is a former association football goalkeeper who represented New Zealand at international level.

Finlayson made a solitary official A-international appearance for New Zealand, coming on as a second-half substitute in a 3–2 win over Saudi Arabia on 23 June 1988.  He appeared in a number of unofficial matches for New Zealand against club and representative sides, notably at the Kings Cup in Thailand where he played two matches, against Rotor Volgograd and Yukong Elephants.

References 

1961 births
Living people
Wellington United players
New Zealand association footballers
New Zealand international footballers
Association football goalkeepers